Akal n-Iguinawen is a Berber phrase meaning "land of the black people." The phrase generally refers to Guinea (region) or the Sudan (region).

References

Berber words and phrases